Princess Marie Alexandra of Schleswig-Holstein-Sonderburg-Glücksburg, since 1941 of Schleswig-Holstein (Marie Alexandra Caroline-Mathilde Viktoria Irene; 9 July 1927, Schloss Louisenlund, Schleswig, Schleswig-Holstein, Germany – 14 December 2000, Friedrichshafen, Baden-Württemberg, Germany) was a member of the House of Schleswig-Holstein-Sonderburg-Glücksburg. Marie Alexandra was the fourth and youngest child of Wilhelm Friedrich, Duke of Schleswig-Holstein and his wife Princess Marie Melita of Hohenlohe-Langenburg. Her older brother Peter was the Duke of Schleswig-Holstein and Head of the House of Oldenburg from 10 February 1965 until his death on 30 September 1980.

Marriage
Marie Alexandra married Douglas Barton-Miller (born 27 December 1929), son of Douglas Barton Miller and his wife, Harriet Maxine Deter, on 22 July 1970 at Grünholz, Schleswig-Holstein, Germany. Marie Alexandra and Douglas did not have children. The couple resided in Friedrichshafen where Douglas was in the restaurant business. Marie Alexandra died in Friedrichshafen in 2000.

Royal Patron - the Order "Ordo Supremus Militaris Templi Hierosolymitani" (OSMTH) A United Nations Non-Governmental Organization (NGO) registered in Geneva, Switzerland. Swiss Federal Registry Number CH-660.1.972.999-4

Ancestry

References

Princesses of Schleswig-Holstein-Sonderburg-Glücksburg
1927 births
2000 deaths
People from Schleswig, Schleswig-Holstein